Ronald Grant (1940/1941 – 27 December 1994) was an American Grand Prix motorcycle road racer. In the 1964 Grand Prix motorcycle racing season, he became the first American rider to finish on the podium in a Grand Prix event, when he finished in second place behind Alan Shepherd at the 250cc United States Grand Prix, held at the Daytona International Speedway.

Grant was born in London before  moving to the United States to work. He earned a job with the Suzuki factory, racing for them in the AMA national championships. Later in 1978, due to his contribution on the project, Suzuki included the initials RG of Ron Grant onto the original model of the Suzuki RG 185, with the initials continued throughout all consecutive productions of the bike until this day. After his racing career ended, he helped boost the careers of Pat Hennen and Randy Mamola. He returned to the UK to manage racing teams for Honda and Suzuki. Grant lived in Louth, Lincolnshire and was killed in a boating accident in Northern Ireland in 1994.

References

1941 births
1994 deaths
People from Louth, Lincolnshire
American motorcycle racers
250cc World Championship riders
Accidental deaths in Northern Ireland
Boating accident deaths